Harry Hoopert (born 16 September 1998) is an Australian rugby union player who plays for the  in the Super Rugby competition.  His position of choice is prop.

References 

Australian rugby union players
1998 births
Living people
Queensland Reds players
Rugby union props
Queensland Country (NRC team) players
Rugby union players from Queensland